Mike Hubbard (born February 11, 1962) is an American former state politician and a convicted felon who was a Republican member of the Alabama House of Representatives, representing the 79th district in Lee County. He was first elected in 1998 and previously served as Speaker of the Alabama House of Representatives. Before that, he was House Minority Leader six years (2004–10) and was twice chairman of the Alabama Republican Party (2007–11).

Early life and education
Hubbard was born and raised in Hartwell, Georgia. During high school, Hubbard beat Ralph Reed to become the Georgia state champion in the Voice of Democracy speech contest. Hubbard went to the University of Georgia on a journalism scholarship, where he helped lead the successful public relations campaign for Herschel Walker’s 1982 Heisman Trophy.

Career 
After graduating, Hubbard got a job in the Auburn University athletic department and led a successful public relations campaign for Bo Jackson’s 1985 Heisman candidacy. Hubbard left Auburn and started a new company, which then won exclusive broadcast rights for all Auburn Tigers sports and made Hubbard a millionaire. Prior to forming Auburn Network in 1994, he was a general manager of Host Communications (1990–1994), and associate sports information director for Auburn University (1984–1990).

His company, Auburn Network, owns and operates four radio stations in the Auburn/Opelika market and publishes a quarterly magazine, East Alabama Living. It also operates an advertising agency, Network Creative Media. His company sold the multi-media rights to Auburn University athletics to International Sports Properties in 2003, which merged with IMG's college sports marketing/broadcasting group in 2010.

Political career
In 1996, Patrick Nix, (quarterback for Auburn in 1993), recommended that Hubbard apply his public relations expertise to Bob Riley’s congressional campaign. Riley won and, in gratitude, invited Hubbard to attend the swearing-in ceremony in the Alabama State Capitol, where Hubbard says he was impressed by the "symbols of our nation’s power."

In 1998, Bill Canary provided polling during Hubbard's first election campaign. Hubbard won, taking a seat in the Alabama House of Representatives representing much of Lee County, Alabama.

In 2002, Riley won the Alabama gubernatorial election, and gave Hubbard the leadership of the Alabama Republican Party. Hubbard would later name his youngest son Riley. As leader of the state's Republican party, Hubbard became a member of the Republican National Committee, and received invitations to visit the White House.

Arrest and conviction 
In 2016, Hubbard was sentenced to four years in prison for felony violations of state ethics laws. He was soon removed as a member of the House. On September 11, 2020, he reported to the Lee County Sheriff's Office to be taken into custody and turned over to the Alabama Department of Corrections to begin his term of imprisonment. Hubbard was released from prison on January 8, 2023.

References

External links
 Mike Hubbard Facebook page
 Mike Hubbard Homepage (archived)
 Alabama Legislature – Mike Hubbard (archived)
 Project Vote Smart – Mike Hubbard
 Campaign contributions: 2008, 2006, 2002, 1998

|-

|-

|-

1959 births
American broadcasters
Auburn University personnel
Living people
Republican Party members of the Alabama House of Representatives
People from Auburn, Alabama
People from Hartwell, Georgia
Speakers of the Alabama House of Representatives
University of Georgia alumni
Alabama politicians convicted of crimes
American United Methodists
2004 United States presidential electors
State political party chairs of Alabama